Music from the Motion Picture: The Great White Hype is the soundtrack to Reginald Hudlin's 1996 film The Great White Hype. It was released in April 1996 through Epic Soundtrax, and consists primarily of hip hop music. Composed of thirteen songs, it features appearances by the likes of Ambersunshower, Biz Markie, Bone Thugs-n-Harmony, Camp Lo, DJ U-Neek, E-40, Insane Clown Posse, Jamie Foxx, Lou Rawls, Marcus Miller, Nyt Owl, Passion, Premier, Rudy Ray Moore, and Wu-Tang Clan members. Production was handled by DJ U-Neek, Marcus Miller, RZA, 4th Disciple, Doug Rasheed, Foster & McElroy, ICP, Jocko, Mike E. Clark, P.M. Dawn, Ski Beatz and Studio Ton. 

The album peaked at number 93 on the Billboard 200, number 27 on the Top R&B/Hip-Hop Albums in the United States. Its lead single, Camp Lo's "Coolie High", peaked at #62 on the Hot R&B/Hip-Hop Songs and #25 on the Hot Rap Songs.

Track listing

Notes
Track 1 is based on "Sweet Dreams (Are Made of This)" written by Annie Lennox and Dave Stewart
Track 3 contains a sample of "Let's Fall in Love" written by The Isley Brothers and Chris Jasper
Track 6 contains a sample of Funny How Time Flies (When You're Having Fun) perform by Janet Jackson
Track 7 contains a sample of "Hangin' on a String" performed by the Loose Ends

Charts

References

External links

1996 soundtrack albums
Hip hop soundtracks
Albums produced by RZA
Epic Records soundtracks
Albums produced by Studio Ton
Albums produced by 4th Disciple
Albums produced by Marcus Miller
Albums produced by Mike E. Clark
Comedy film soundtracks